Lampeter ((formal); Llambed (colloquial)) is a town, community and electoral ward in Ceredigion, Wales, at the confluence of the Afon Dulas with the River Teifi. It is the third largest urban area in Ceredigion, after Aberystwyth and Cardigan, and has a campus of the University of Wales Trinity Saint David. At the 2011 Census, the population was 2,970. Lampeter is the smallest university town in the United Kingdom. The university adds approximately 1,000 people to the town's population during term time.

Etymology 
The Welsh name of the town, means "Peter's church [at] Stephen's bridge" in reference to its church and castle. Its English name derives from this, as does the colloquial Welsh name . An alternative English spelling occurs as "Thlampetre" in 1433.

History

The Norman castle of Pont Steffan ("Stephen's bridge" in English) occupying a strategic position beside the River Teifi was destroyed in 1187 after it had been conquered by Owain Gwynedd.

Cardiganshire was one of the royal counties established by Edward I after the defeat of Llywelyn ap Gruffudd (Llywelyn Ein Llyw Olaf) at Cilmeri in 1282, when Lampeter fell under direct Royal Control. This, however, had little effect on the town and the Welsh language and culture continued to thrive. The first Borough Charter was granted in 1284 to Rhys ap Meredydd who was given the right to hold a weekly market. As many as eight fairs were also held each year under successive charters.

The town was ruled by a local aristocracy who lived in elegant mansions, including Brynhywel, Maesyfelin and the Lloyd baronets of Peterwell. As magistrates, they handed out the severest of penalties to offenders. The fairs and markets had become rowdy occasions characterised by violence and drunkenness and the stocks and whipping post in front of Lampeter Town Hall were frequently put to use in the 18th century.

The town developed the crafts, services and industries to cater to the needs of the rural area. There were several woollen mills, one of which in the mid-18th century was already producing the complex double-woven tapestry cloth later to become associated with the Welsh woollen industry. There were also blacksmiths, a leather tannery, carpenters, saddlers, bootmakers and hatters. The town was one of the main centres on the Welsh drovers' road for the dispatch of cattle and sheep on foot to the markets in England. A large number of inns point to the town's importance as a rural centre.

Lampeter's war memorial, sculpted by Sir William Goscombe John (1860–1952), was unveiled in September 1921.

University

St David's College was founded in Lampeter in 1822 by Thomas Burgess, Bishop of St David's, to provide training for those wishing to join the Anglican priesthood. It was the first institution of higher education in Wales and the third oldest in England and Wales after Oxford and Cambridge. In 1852 it was granted a charter to award the BD degree and in 1865 another charter enabled it to confer BA degrees in liberal arts. Its central building, based on an Oxbridge-style quadrangle was designed by Charles Robert Cockerell.

In 1971, it became a constituent part of the University of Wales as St David's University College and was renamed the University of Wales, Lampeter, in 1996. In 2008, the Lampeter institution's original charter was used to reform higher education in West Wales with the integration of Trinity College Carmarthen, further education colleges in Cardigan and Llanelli, and the technical college known as Swansea Metropolitan into the University of Wales Trinity Saint David.

The university's Rugby Union team was the first in Wales. It was formed in the 1850s by Rowland Williams who introduced the game from Cambridge.

Governance
Lampeter is the name of the electoral ward which is coterminous with the community, though prior to 1995 it was a ward for Dyfed County Council and also included the neighbouring community of Llangybi. Since 1995 the ward has elected two county councillors to Ceredigion County Council. The ward has elected a Welsh Labour Party councillor and an Independent councillor at each election since 1995.

At the local level Lampeter is represented by 14 town councillors on Lampeter Town Council.

Culture

 Lampeter's local Eisteddfod, Eisteddfod Rhys Thomas James Pantyfedwen, is held annually over the August bank holiday. It is particularly noteworthy for its competition for singers under the age of 30, colloquially known as Llais Llwyfan Llambed ('the voice of Lampeter's stage').
 Lampeter Museum covers the cultural and agricultural development of the town as well as the history of the college.
 Theatr Felinfach, a small regional theatre located outside the village of Ystrad Aeron in Dyffryn Aeron, about 7 miles from Lampeter.
 During the Second World War, Dylan Thomas and his wife Caitlin lived at Plas Gelli, a secluded mansion just outside Talsarn. The Dylan Thomas Trail links Talsarn and Lampeter with the other places in Ceredigion associated with the poet, such as Aberaeron and New Quay.
 In 1968, William Julian Cayo-Evans first marched his paramilitary nationalist 'Free Wales Army' from Lampeter.
 The Church of Our Lady of Mount Carmel, a Roman Catholic Church, is Grade II listed and is considered a fine example of mid-20th century church architecture.

Notable people 

 Eliezer Griffiths (1827–1920), a Congregationalist minister, worked in Australia and America
 David Thomas (1829–1905), a Welsh clergyman helped found a Welsh church in the Welsh settlement in Argentina.
 John Perowne VD, TD (1863–1954), a British Army officer and a King's Messenger 
 Watcyn Samuel Jones (1877–1964), agricultural administrator and theological college principal.
 Glyn Daniel FBA, FRAI (1914 in Lampeter Velfrey – 1986), a Welsh scientist and archaeologist who taught the European Neolithic period
 Gillian Elisa (born 1953), a Welsh actress, singer and comedian.
 Elin Jones (born 1966), politician, the Llywydd of the Senedd (presiding officer) since 2016.

Sport
Lampeter has a strong sporting community, which includes Cwmann and Llanybydder. Many sports are played in the town,/ with rugby union being the most popular. Lampeter fielded the first rugby union team in Wales. The sport is believed to have arrived in the late 1840s, meaning the town has a very long tie and history with the sport. The town is represented by Lampeter Town Rugby which is a member of the Welsh Rugby Union and is a feeder club for the Llanelli Scarlets.

Many other sports are played in the town, including association football, with the town being represented by a football team, their pitch being directly next to the main pitch of Lampeter Rugby Club. The football team has junior teams as well as a 1st and 2nd team. The town is served by a leisure centre, which has a gym, the main hall and modern tennis facilities. The town has a swimming pool and also a bowling green.

Transport

In 1911, a branch line opened to Aberaeron. Following the nationalisation of the railways, the passenger service to Aberaeron ceased in 1951. Passenger trains on the main line to Carmarthen and Aberystwyth continued until December 1964 when the track was badly damaged by flooding south of Aberystwyth and through trains were suspended. This was the era of the "Beeching Axe" and it took little political persuasion to decide that the cost of repairs would be unjustified. The remaining passenger services were withdrawn. Milk trains continued to the processing factories at Pont Llanio until 1970, and Felinfach until 1973. The line was eventually lifted in 1975. However, the section of the old line between Bronwydd Arms and Danycoed Halt still exists and is used by the Gwili Railway, a steam railway preservation society which operates a regular timetable during summer months.

Regular bus services operate through the town, connecting Lampeter to Aberystwyth, Carmarthen and Swansea. Two buses a day continue beyond Swansea, providing a through service to Cardiff.

Twinning
Lampeter is twinned with Saint-Germain-sur-Moine, France.

See also

 All Saints' Church, Cellan

References

External links

 Town website
 Tourist information 
 Photos of Lampeter and the surrounding area

 
Towns in Ceredigion
Wards of Ceredigion
Wards of Dyfed
Market towns in Wales
Castles in Ceredigion